The Ryazan Oblast Duma is the regional parliament of Ryazan Oblast, a federal subject of Russia. A total of 40 deputies are elected for five-year terms.

Elections

2020

Notes

References

Ryazan Oblast
Politics of Ryazan Oblast